The flora of Connecticut comprise a variety of plant species. Geobotanically, Connecticut belongs to the North American Atlantic Region.

 The state tree is the white oak; or more specifically, the Charter Oak.
 The state flower is the mountain laurel.

Biodiversity
A complete census of tree species taken in 1885 in Hartford County listed 56 species of trees.

List of flora

Floral regions
A large part of the state of Connecticut is covered with oak-hickory type central hardwood forest.  This region was historically dominated by various oaks and chestnuts, but hickory replaced chestnut with the spread of the chestnut blight.

In the northwestern hills of the state, more northern-hardwood type trees are present.

See also
 Fauna of Connecticut
 List of mammals in Connecticut

References

 
Flora of the Northeastern United States
Natural history of Connecticut
 Flora